Ozai may refer to:
Fire Lord Ozai, a character in Avatar: The Last Airbender
 Ōzai village, Kitaamabe District, Ōita, Japan 
Ōzai Station, Ōita, Ōita Prefecture, Japan
Ōzai Campus of Nippon Bunri University
Trstenik Airport (ICAO: LYTR), also known as "Ozai", an airport in Serbia
 Ozaï, an 1847 ballet by Jean Coralli